Chris Shelley (born June 22, 1963) is an American speed skater. He competed in the men's 1500 metres event at the 1992 Winter Olympics. Shelley later moved to Calgary and became the coach of the Canadian national team.

References

External links
 

1963 births
Living people
American male speed skaters
Olympic speed skaters of the United States
Speed skaters at the 1992 Winter Olympics
Sportspeople from Boston